A blue pencil is a pencil traditionally used by a copy editor or sub-editor to show corrections to a written copy. 

The colour is used specifically because it will not show in some lithographic or photographic reproduction processes; these are known as non-photo blue pencils. For similar reasons, sometimes red pencils are used since their pigment will not reproduce by xerography.

With the introduction of electronic editing using word processors or desktop publishing, literal blue pencils are seen more rarely.

See also
Non-photo blue
Colored pencil
 List of proofreader's marks
 Blue pencil doctrine a legal doctrine in common law countries where some parts of a contract are enforced, but not the entire contract.

External links

Copy editing
Pencils